The 2014 BNP Paribas de Nouvelle-Calédonie was a professional tennis tournament played on hard courts. It was the eleventh edition of the tournament which was part of the 2014 ATP Challenger Tour. It took place in Nouméa, New Caledonia between 30 December 2013 and 5 January 2014.

Singles main-draw entrants

Seeds

 1 Rankings are as of December 24, 2013.

Other entrants
The following players received wildcards into the singles main draw:
  Enzo Couacaud
  Albano Olivetti
  Jose Statham

The following players received entry from the qualifying draw:
  Kimmer Coppejans
  Austin Krajicek
  Huang Liang-Chi
  Ante Pavić

The following players received entry as a lucky loser:
  Denys Molchanov

Champions

Singles

 Alejandro Falla def.  Steven Diez 6–2, 6–2

Doubles

 Austin Krajicek /  Tennys Sandgren def.  Ante Pavić /  Blaž Rola 7–6(7–4), 6–4

External links
Official Website

Internationaux de Nouvelle-Caledonie
Internationaux de Nouvelle-Calédonie
Inter
2014 in French tennis